Bryony Botha (born 4 November 1997) is a New Zealand road and track cyclist. She competed at the 2020 Summer Olympics, in Women's team pursuit.

Life 
Botha was raised in Auckland, New Zealand and attended Rangitoto College.

In 2015, Botha was part of the team pursuit that won the event, and broke the world team pursuit record, at the Junior Track World Championship. In 2017 Botha represented New Zealand at the Oceania Track Cycling Championships where she won the team pursuit and scratch race. Later in the year Botha also competed at the Chile Track Cycling World Cup, winning gold in the women's team pursuit.

She represented New Zealand at the 2018 Commonwealth Games claiming silver in the team pursuit. Botha also won bronze in the team pursuit at the 2019 Track Cycling World Championships in Poland.

Career achievements

Major results

2014
 National Junior Track Championships
1st  Individual pursuit
1st  Omnium
3rd 500m time trial
 3rd  Team pursuit, UCI Juniors Track World Championships
2015
 1st  Team pursuit, UCI Juniors Track World Championships
 2nd Omnium, National Junior Track Championships
 3rd Time trial, National Junior Road Championships
2016
 1st  Team pursuit, National Track Championships
2017
 National Track Championships
1st  Team pursuit
3rd Madison
2018
 2nd  Team pursuit, Commonwealth Games
2019
 1st  Team pursuit, National Track Championships
 3rd  Team pursuit, UCI Track Cycling World Championships
2022
 1st  Individual pursuit, Commonwealth Games
 2nd  Team pursuit, Commonwealth Games
 2nd  Individual pursuit, UCI Track Cycling World Championships

Awards
In 2015 Botha won Auckland's Youth Sportswoman of the Year award and North Harbour Junior Sports Woman of the Year award.

References

External links

1997 births
Commonwealth Games medallists in cycling
Commonwealth Games silver medallists for New Zealand
Cyclists at the 2018 Commonwealth Games
Living people
New Zealand female cyclists
People educated at Rangitoto College
Cyclists from Auckland
New Zealand track cyclists
Olympic cyclists of New Zealand
Cyclists at the 2020 Summer Olympics
Cyclists at the 2022 Commonwealth Games
Commonwealth Games competitors for New Zealand
Commonwealth Games gold medallists for New Zealand
20th-century New Zealand women
21st-century New Zealand women
People from Takapuna
Medallists at the 2018 Commonwealth Games
Medallists at the 2022 Commonwealth Games